Tyler Thompson (1907–2002) was an American Ambassador to Finland and Iceland.  He also served as the Director General of the Foreign Service.

Tyler entered the Foreign Service in 1931 after graduating from Princeton University.

References

External links
Ambassador Tyler Thompson to Ivan White, 5 August 1960, top secret, excised copy

Princeton University alumni
Ambassadors of the United States to Finland
Ambassadors of the United States to Iceland
1907 births
2002 deaths